Piotr Jabłkowski (born 10 March 1958) is a Polish fencer. He won a silver medal in the team épée event at the 1980 Summer Olympics.

References

1958 births
Living people
Polish male fencers
Olympic fencers of Poland
Fencers at the 1980 Summer Olympics
Olympic silver medalists for Poland
Olympic medalists in fencing
Sportspeople from Opole
Medalists at the 1980 Summer Olympics
20th-century Polish people
21st-century Polish people